Whatever You Can Spare is a 1979 Yugoslav film directed by Bogdan Žižić.

External links

Whatever You Can Spare at hrfilm.hr 

1979 films
Croatian romantic drama films
Yugoslav romantic drama films
Jadran Film films
Films directed by Bogdan Žižić